Pakokku University is a public university located in Pakokku, Magway Region, central Myanmar. The university offers bachelor's degree programs in common liberal arts and sciences disciplines.

The university has one main building, where graduation ceremonies are held.

Degrees

Bachelor of Arts (BA)
Bachelor of Science (Bsc)
Master of Arts (MA)
Master of Science (M.Sc)

Departments
Department of Myanmar
Department of English
Department of Physics
Department of History
Department of Philosophy
Department of Law
Department of Geography
Department of Oriental Studies
Department of Mathematics
Department of Chemistry
Department of Biochemistry 
Department of Zoology
Department of Botany
Department of Geology
Department of Literary Writing

References

External links
Wikimapia
Facebook

 Universities and colleges in Magway Region